The Powhattan or Powhatan was an American ship that is best remembered as one of the New Jersey shipwrecks with the greatest loss of life. The number of victims varies, according to sources, between 200 and 365.

The Powhattan was an emigrant ship transport of 598 tons gross. It was registered as a new vessel on February 2, 1837, with W. Graham as owner and D. Griffith as master (captain). The ship was built in Baltimore, Maryland, in 1836–1837 and made several trips across the Atlantic from England, France and the Netherlands to the ports of Baltimore and New York.

About the first of March 1854, the Powhattan sailed from the port of Le Havre, France, destined for New York City. It was carrying more than 200 German emigrants. After encountering a storm off the New Jersey coast it went aground about 5:00 p.m. on April 15, 1854, on the shoals near Harvey Cedars, New Jersey (latitude 39 33 00 North −74 13 00 West ), about six miles south of the Harvey Cedars Lifesaving Station. The ship remained afloat until the following day, April 16, 1854, whereupon it broke apart resulting in the deaths of the entire crew and passengers. At the time of the accident, the ship was commanded by Captain James Meyers (or Myers) of Baltimore. The victims washed onto the beach as far south as Atlantic City, where they were buried in three cemeteries. Fifty-four were interred in a mass grave at Smithville Methodist Church and 45 were buried in Absecon. The majority of the bodies, about 140, washed ashore at Peahala on Long Beach Island. These victims were buried in pauper's graves in the Baptist cemetery in nearby Manahawkin. The cemetery now includes "The Unknown from the Sea" monument erected by the State of New Jersey in 1904 honoring all the victims of the Powhattan shipwreck. The Powhattan disaster served as an impetus for the purchase of the site for the Absecon Lighthouse later in 1854.

Voyages from 1837 to 1854

Sources
 Great Storms of the Jersey Shore, by Larry Savadove and Margaret Thomas Buchholz, published by Down the Shore, 1993
 The New York Times April 21, 1854
 The Baltimore Sun, April 21, 1854, Friday morning edition
 The Daily Alta California, May 19, 1854 
 A Heavy Sea Running: The Formation of the U.S. Life-Saving Service, 1846–1878 By Dennis R. Means, Winter 1987, Vol. 19, No. 4 
 Brigantine Beach, New Jersey website 
New Jersey Museum of Boating, Inc., Bay Head, New Jersey
Maritime Heritage Project www.MaritimeHeritage.org, Post Office Box 2878, Sausalito, California, 94966 
Immigrant Ships Transcribers Guild
 Proceedings of the New Jersey Historical Society, 1884, published January 17, 1884, page 82–83

References 

Shipwrecks in the Atlantic Ocean
Shipwrecks of the New Jersey coast
Maritime incidents in April 1854
1837 ships